Hana as a given name may have any of several origins. It is also a Kurdish name meaning hope, a Persian name meaning flower (حَنا) and an Arabic name meaning bliss. As a Japanese name, it is usually translated as flower. In Korean, it means the number one. In Hawaiian, "Hana" means "craft" or "work". In Maori, "Hana" means to shine, glow, give out love or radiance. In Albanian, "Hana" means the moon.

People

Czech and Slovak 
Hana Dostalová (1890–1981), Czech painter
Hana Vítová (1914–1987), Czechoslovak film actress
Hana Zelinová (1914–2004), Slovak writer
Hana Maria Pravda (née Becková ; 1916–2008), Czechoslovakian-born British actress
Hana Ponická (1922–2007), Slovak writer and dissident
Hana Greenfield (née Lustigová; 1926–2014), Czechoslovak concentration camp survivor, later a writer in Israel
Hana Bobková (born 1929), Czech gymnast
Hana Hegerová (1931–2021), Slovak singer
Hana Janků (1940–1995), Czech opera singer
Hana Růžičková (1941–1981), Czech gymnast
Hana Librová (born 1943), Czech biologist
Hana Shezifi (born 1943), Israeli Olympic runner
Hana Orgoníková (1945–2014), Czech politician
Hana Mičechová (born 1946), Czech gymnast
Hana Zagorová (1946-2022), Czech singer
Hana Mašková (1949–1972), Czech figure skater
Hana Lišková (born 1952), Czech gymnast
Hana Knapová (born 1956), Czechoslovak figure skater
Hana Mandlíková (born 1962), Czech professional tennis player
Hana Vejvodová (1963–1994), Czech pianist
Hana Jonášová (born 1966), Czech opera singer
Hana Andronikova (1967–2011), Czech writer
Hana Říčná (born 1968), Czechoslovak gymnast
Hana Černá (born 1974), Czech freestyle and medley swimmer
Hana Benešová (born 1975), Czech sprinter
Hana Šromová (born 1978), Czech tennis player
Hana Vymazalová (born 1978), Czech Egyptologist
Hana Horáková (born 1979), Czech basketball player
Hana Blažíková (born 1980), Czech soprano and harpist
Hana Klapalová (born 1982), Czech beach volleyball player
Hana Vagnerová (born 1983), Czech stage and television actress
Hana Bajtošova (born 1984), Czech cyclist
Hana Martínková (born 1985), Czech handball player
Hana Soukupová (born 1985), Czech supermodel
Hana Birnerová (born 1989), Czech tennis player
Hana Kutlvašrová (born 1989), Czech handball player
Hana Sloupová (born 1991), Czech football player
Hana Koudelová, Czechoslovak slalom canoeist

Japanese 
, Japanese woman of the late Azuchi-Momoyama through early Edo period 
Hana Kobayashi (born 1982), Venezuelan-Japanese singer
, Japanese artist 
, Japanese actress
 , Japanese professional wrestler
, Japanese shogi player

Korean 
Lee Ha-na (born 1982), South Korean actress
Oh Ha-na (born 1985), South Korean fencer
Park Ha-na (born 1985), South Korean actress
Yoo Ha-na (born 1986), South Korean actress
Kim Ha-na (born 1989), South Korean badminton player
Han Hana (born 1990), South Korean actress
Jung Hana (born 1990), South Korean rapper, member of girl group Secret
Jang Ha-na (born 1992), South Korean golfer
Hana Mae Lee, American actress of Korean descent

Arab 
Hana Sweid (born 1955), Israeli Arab politician
Hana Majaj (born 1982), Jordanian swimmer
Hana Shalabi (born 1982), Palestinian prisoner in Israel
Hana Sheha (born 1985), Egyptian actress
Hana Mareghni (born 1989), Tunisian judo practitioner
Hana Elhebshi, Libyan activist
Hana Hajjar, Saudi cartoonist

Other 
Hana Catherine Mullens (1826–1861), Swiss writer born in India who wrote one of the earliest Bengali novels
Hana Meisel (1883–1972), Israeli agronomist
Hana Shezifi (born 1943), Israeli Olympic runner
Hana Wirth-Nesher (born 1948), Israeli literary scholar
Hana Kuk (born 1986), Hong Kong singer-songwriter
Hana Makhmalbaf (born 1988), Iranian filmmaker
Hana Pestle (born 1989), American musician
Hana Beaman, American snowboarder

Fictional characters 
Works from Japan
Hana, a character in the manga series Peacemaker Kurogane
Hana, a character in the anime film  Tokyo Godfathers
Hana, a character in the anime film Wolf Children
Hana-chan, a character in the anime series Ojamajo Doremi
Hana Asakura, a character in the manga series Shaman King
Hana N. Fountainstand, a character in the manga series Hanayamata
, protagonist of the manga series Slow Start
Hana Inuzuka, a character in the manga and anime series Naruto, and anime series Naruto Shippuden
Hana Isuzu, a character in the anime series Girls und Panzer
, a character in the anime series Hugtto! PreCure
Hana Yamaguchi, a character in Japanese manga series Guru Guru Pon-chan
Hanatarou Yamada, a character in the manga and anime series Bleach
Saki Hanajima (Hana-chan), a character in the manga and anime series Fruits Basket
Hana Midorikawa, a character in the manga and anime series, Prison School
 Hana, the protagonist in the Young Samurai novel The Ring of Water
Hana Uzaki, the protagonist of Uzaki-chan Wants to Hang Out!

Works from elsewhere
Hana, the wife of Sadao in Pearl Buck's short story "The Enemy"
Hana, a Canadian nurse in the novel and film The English Patient
Hana Stoppable, Ron's adopted baby sister in the 2002–2007 Disney Channel animated series Kim Possible
Hana Gitelman, a character in 2006–2010 American graphics novel series Heroes
Hana Tsu-Vachel, player character first introduced in 2009 in American video game series Fear Effect
Jung Hana, a character in 2012 South Korean drama Love Rain
D.Va, real name Hana Song, a fictional South Korean pro gamer and a player character in the video games Overwatch and Heroes of the Storm
Hana the Hanukkah Fairy, a character in the British book series Rainbow Magic

See also 
Hana (disambiguation)

References 

Albanian feminine given names
Arabic feminine given names
Bosnian feminine given names
Czech feminine given names
Given names derived from plants or flowers
Japanese feminine given names
Jewish feminine given names
Korean feminine given names
Slavic feminine given names
Slovak feminine given names